The St. Stephens Courthouse, listed on the National Register of Historic Places as the Washington County Courthouse and also known as the St. Stephens Masonic Lodge, is a historic former courthouse building in St. Stephens, Alabama.  The Alabama Legislature authorized construction of the building in 1853 to serve as headquarters for the government of Washington County. The building was completed in 1854 and served as the county courthouse until 1907, when the county seat was moved to Chatom.  It served a variety of purposes after that, until being restored in 2000 by the St. Stephens Historical Commission for use as a visitor center and local history museum.

References

External links

National Register of Historic Places in Washington County, Alabama
County courthouses in Alabama
Former Masonic buildings in Alabama
Greek Revival architecture in Alabama
Government buildings completed in 1854
Buildings and structures in Washington County, Alabama
Courthouses on the National Register of Historic Places in Alabama
Historic American Buildings Survey in Alabama
1854 establishments in Alabama